Lutynia may refer to:

Czech Republic
 Dolní Lutyně, a village in Karviná District
 Lutyně (Orlová), a part of the town of Orlová in Karviná District

Poland
Lutynia, Kłodzko County in Lower Silesian Voivodeship (south-west Poland)
Lutynia, Pleszew County in Greater Poland Voivodeship (west-central Poland)
Lutynia, Środa Śląska County in Lower Silesian Voivodeship (south-west Poland)
Lutynia, Środa Wielkopolska County in Greater Poland Voivodeship (west-central Poland)